Spartans Distrito Capital, also known as Spartans DC, is a Venezuelan basketball club based in Caracas. The team plays in the Venezuelan SuperLiga, the premier national basketball league and won its first championship in 2020.

History
The Spartans Distrito Capital club was founded in May 2019 in order to "promote the development of Venezuelan basketball at all levels". The club began its activities at the Pedagogical institute of Caracas but later moved to the Gimnasio José Beracasa.
On October 1, 2020, the Spartans were announced as one of the 16 teams to play in the SuperLiga. The team won the inaugural season, capturing their first national title behind league MVP Pedro Chourio.

Honours
Venezuelan SuperLiga
Champions (1): 2020

Players

Current roster

References

External links
Official website (in Spanish)
Spartans de Distrito Capital Caracas at Latinbasket.com

Sport in Caracas
Basketball teams established in 2019
Basketball teams in Venezuela